Nyctemera mesolychna is a moth of the family Erebidae. It is widely distributed in the eastern part of New Guinea at altitudes ranging from sea level to 1,800 meters.

The length of the forewings is 19–21 mm. The forewings are brown, the basal half with white veins. The wingfold and longitudinal line in the cell are white. The hindwings have a broad hindmargin.

References

Nyctemerina
Moths described in 1889